Oregon station is a rapid transit passenger rail station on SEPTA's Broad Street Line. It is located at 2700 South Broad Street (PA 611) at the intersection of Oregon Avenue in the Marconi Plaza neighborhood of South Philadelphia, Pennsylvania, and is the last stop before the southern terminus of the line. Oregon station opened on April 8, 1973 on the north side of Marconi Park.

Station layout 
Access to the station is via two station houses on northeast and southeast corners of Broad Street and Oregon Avenue. Like the neighboring NRG station, Oregon station fare control barriers are at street level.

Gallery

References

External links 

SEPTA Broad Street Line stations
Railway stations in the United States opened in 1973
Railway stations in Philadelphia
Railway stations located underground in Pennsylvania